Sven Birkerts (born 21 September 1951) is an American essayist and literary critic. He is best known for his book The Gutenberg Elegies (1994), which posits a decline in reading due to the overwhelming advances of the Internet and other technologies of the "electronic culture." In 2006 he published a revised edition with new introduction and afterword, reflecting on the endurance of reading.

Birkerts was born in Pontiac, Michigan, and grew up in the metropolitan Detroit area. He graduated from Cranbrook School and from the University of Michigan in 1973.

After publishing several well-received books of collected essays on literature, Birkerts was appointed to many prominent editorial and teaching positions. He became the Director of the Bennington College Writing Seminars, a position he assumed after the death of Liam Rector. Birkerts was the editor of AGNI, the literary journal and has taught writing at Harvard University, Emerson College, Amherst College, and Mount Holyoke College.

He lives in Arlington, Massachusetts, with his wife Lynn. He has two children, Mara and Liam.

His father was noted architect Gunnar Birkerts, who based his practice in the Detroit area after immigrating to the United States following completion of his architectural degree in Stuttgart. He was born and grew up in Latvia, leaving as a young man before the Soviet Army occupied the nation in the last days of World War II.

Works
 An Artificial Wilderness: Essays on 20th Century Literature. (1987). New York: William Morrow.
 The Electric Life: Essays on Modern Poetry. (1989). New York: William Morrow.
 American Energies: Essays on Fiction. (1992). New York: William Morrow.
 The Gutenberg Elegies: The Fate of Reading in an Electronic Age. (1994). Boston: Faber and Faber.
 Readings. (1999). St. Paul, MN: Graywolf Press.
 My Sky Blue Trades: Growing Up Counter in a Contrary Time. (2002). New York: Viking.
 The Other Walk. (2011). St. Paul, MN: Graywolf Press.
 Changing the Subject: Art and Attention in the Internet Age. (2015). St. Paul, MN: Graywolf Press.

Sources
 

1951 births
University of Michigan alumni
Harvard University faculty
Bennington College faculty
Living people
Emerson College faculty
Mount Holyoke College faculty
People from Arlington, Massachusetts
People from Pontiac, Michigan
Writing teachers
Cranbrook Educational Community alumni
American people of Latvian descent
Writers from Michigan
Writers from Massachusetts
Fellows of the American Academy of Arts and Sciences
American essayists